The MDT David is an ultra light armored personnel carrier and light Armored Vehicle assembled by MDT Armor Corporation for the Israeli Security Forces. The vehicle is based on Land Rover Defender and Toyota Land Cruiser platforms and replaces the AIL Storm.

Design
It is designed to provide protection in low intensity conflict. It is capable of resistance from assault rifle fire, blast from floor and roof, and limited protection against Improvised Explosive Devices.

The David has a 4-cylinder, turbocharged inter-cooled diesel engine. It can accommodate 4–6 fully armed people with three doors, roof hatch and 4–6 windows.

See also 
 Military equipment of Israel

References

External links 

 MDT David
 Arotech and Israel Military Industries Ltd (IMI) to Jointly Market the David

Military vehicles of Israel
2000s cars
Off-road vehicles
All-wheel-drive vehicles
Jeep platforms
Armoured cars of Israel
Compact sport utility vehicles